, better known by his stage name Wise, is a Japanese rapper who raps in both English and Japanese. His mother is American and his father is Japanese and during high school, he lived in the United States. He is affiliated with the creative group Kazenohito. In 2005, he formed the group Wise'N'SonPub with beatmaker SonPub and the group Teriyaki Boyz with Ryo-Z, Ilmari (from Rip Slyme) and Verbal (from M-Flo). He made his major debut as a solo artist with the single "Shine Like A Star" on February 21, 2007.

Discography

Singles
Alive
"Alive"
"My Way"
"Wanna Know Ya"
"Shine Like a Star" (Soul Source Production Mix)
Shine Like a Star (Feb. 21, 2007)
"Shine Like a Star" (August 2007)
"One Chance"
"Shine Like a Star" (Instrumental)
"One Chance" (Instrumental)
Thinking of You (May 23, 2007)
"Thinking of You"
"Good Music" (feat. MC Leo)
Mirror (July 23, 2008)
"Mirror" Feat. Salyu
Furimukanaide Feat. Hiromi (April 1, 2009)
"Furimukanaide" Feat. Hiromi
"Unchain my Heart" Feat. May J
"Furimukanaide" Feat. Hiromi (Instrumental)

Albums
Children of the Sun (October 10, 2007)
"Time To Rise"
"Shine Like a Star"
"Delicious"
"Never at Once" Feat. Himiko
"Thinking of You"
"Hey Girl!" Feat. Su (Rip Slyme)
"Taiyou no Kodomo" Feat. Afra. Cro-magnon
"Good Music" Feat. mc Leo
"Play That Song"
"Alive"
"Hi no Tori" Feat. Cro-magnon
Love Quest (May 27, 2009)
"Love Quest"
"Aenakutemo" feat. Kana Nishino
"Into the Sky" feat. Beat Crusaders
"...In your Happiness"
"Big City of Dreams" feat. Taro Soul
"Furimukanaide" feat. Hiromi
"Best Friend's Girl"
"Mae e"
"Free"
"Can't Stop" feat. Speech (From Arrested Development)
"Mirror" feat. Salyu
"Unchain my Heart" feat. May J.
Dakid (Aug. 10, 2005) as WISE`N'SONPUB
"Welcome"
"Memento"
"Space Travelers"
"Free Fall"
"Drums Makes Romance"
"Hi no Tori"
"After the Rain..."
"Simple Walk"
"Zambot 3"
"Nurture our Nature"
"SK8 SKIT"
"History"
"Departure"

Other Releases
Mellow Yellow "Chikyū Walker"
4 the Fabulous feat. YOUKID, WISE (Kaze no Hito) (June 29, 2005)
YOSHIKA "timeless" (Jan. 18, 2006)
13.alive feat. WISE
Def Tech "Catch The Wave" (Apr. 26, 2006)
9. Off The Edge feat. WISE
Kaori Natori "Perfume" (May 24, 2006)
13.I believe myself feat. WISE
Masaharu Fukuyama "Fukuyama Masaharu ANOTHER WORKS remixed by Piston Nishizawa" (May 24, 2006)
3.Sakura Zaka～featuring WISE
Ya-kyim "Keep YA Style" (Aug. 2, 2006)
6.STYLES feat.SIMON,NORISIAM-X,WISE & GS
BoA "THE FACE" (Feb. 27, 2008)
3. My way, Your way feat. WISE
Kana Nishino "LOVE one." (Jun. 6, 2009)
2. Tōkutemo feat. Wise

See also
Teriyaki Boyz
M-Flo
RIP SLYME
A Bathing Ape

External links
Official Site
Kazenohito Official Site
Unofficial Colombian Fansite (In English And Spanish)
So Alive V2.0(unofficial blog)

1979 births
Living people
Japanese male singers
Japanese rappers
Japanese people of American descent
Musicians from Aichi Prefecture